Cinda Boomershine (born June 4, 1972) is an American entrepreneur, designer and TV personality.  She rose to prominence for her appearances in the hit TBS show Movie and a Makeover and is best known as the creator and founder of cinda b, a line of travel bags, totes and accessories.

Life and education

Boomershine was born in Atlanta, GA on June 4, 1972.  Her father, Ryland Koets, is an architect and skilled builder.  Her mother, Elizabeth Koets, is a kitchen designer.   She graduated from Westminster Schools in Atlanta, GA attended Vanderbilt University where she was president of the residential student body and a member of the Tri-Delta sorority.  She got her MBA for Georgia State University.

Career 

Boomershine started her professional career as the Press Secretary for a Congressional Candidate.  Following his win, she worked briefly in Washington, DC before returning to Atlanta and taking a job at a local marketing and advertising firm.

In 2000, Boomershine, along with her husband, Mark Boomershine, opened an off-road adventure tour company in Highlands, NC called Highlands Safari.
In 2002, Boomershine followed her passion for design and opened an interior design firm.  In 2003, a producer at TBS noticed Cinda’s work and hired her as an on-camera Design Expert on TBS’s weekly show "Movie and a Makeover".  For the next eight years until the show wrapped, Cinda appeared regularly and made over everything from a dreary laundry room to a vintage motor home.  In 2007 Cinda worked as a co-host with Vern Yipp on the HGTV’s hit show Deserving Design.  In 2008, she joined the show Decorating Cents  on HGTV as guest designer.

With a business in both, Atlanta, GA and Highlands, NC, Cinda soon found herself living out of her weekend bag.  Cinda looked everywhere for a suitable replacement but couldn’t find a functional weekend bag with a fresh, modern look that didn’t cost heaps of cash.  So using those sewing skills she honed as a child, her passion for design and her background in business, she designed her own line and the cinda b brand was born in late 2004. In 2013, Boomershine appeared as the Mystery Guest on the Bloomberg Television show Pimm Fox.

Personal life 

Boomershine is married to artist Mark Boomershine.  They were high school sweet hearts.  After a long struggle to have children, they now have a daughter and a son.  Together they have renovated and restored several homes. The Boomershines currently reside in Los Angeles, CA.

References

1972 births
Living people
Businesspeople from Atlanta
Vanderbilt University alumni
Businesspeople from Los Angeles